William H. Roundtree (July 30, 1921 - January 19, 2000) was an American politician. He served as a Democratic member of the Florida House of Representatives.

Life and career 
Roundtree was born in Alachua County, Florida. He attended Melrose Florida High School, Aviation Machinist School, the University of Georgia, Northwestern State University and Lon Morris College. He served in the United States Navy.

In 1965, Roundtree was elected to the Florida House of Representatives, succeeding Jim Dressler, serving until 1966.

Roundtree was a member of the Democratic Executive Committee of Brevard County, Florida.

References 

1921 births
2000 deaths
People from Alachua County, Florida
Democratic Party members of the Florida House of Representatives
20th-century American politicians
University of Georgia alumni
Northwestern State University alumni
Lon Morris College alumni
Military personnel from Florida
United States Navy sailors